Mohammad Ahmadzadeh (Born November 25, 1986 in Rudsar, Iran) is an Iranian Beach Soccer player and Iran National Beach Soccer team captain.

Honours 
Beach Soccer

 Iran

 FIFA Beach Soccer World Cup Third place: 2017
 Beach Soccer Intercontinental Cup winner: 2013
 Asian Championship winner : 2013,2017 Third place: 2011, 2008
 Asian Beach Games winner: 2012, Third place: 2010

Individual

 Golden Ball, Best Beach Soccer player of the year 2017

References 

1986 births
Living people
Sportspeople from Gilan province
Iranian beach soccer players